Tubores is a municipality of the state of Nueva Esparta, Venezuela. Tubores includes part of Nueva Esparta's main island, Isla Margarita, as well as the whole of the sparsely inhabited island of Cubagua to the south. The capital is Punta de Piedras on Isla Margarita.

Municipalities of Nueva Esparta
Margarita Island